Killarney is a rural town and locality in the Southern Downs Region, Queensland, Australia. It borders New South Wales.

Geography
It is close to Queen Mary Falls in the Main Range National Park, where Spring Creek plunges  into the valley.

Mountain View is a neighbourhood within the locality of Killarney.

Melrose is a neighbourhood within the locality of Killarney; it is associated with the Melrose pastoral station.

History
The Githabal (also known as Gidabal, Kitabal) language region includes the landscape within the local government boundaries of the Southern Downs Regional Council, particularly Warwick, Killarney and Woodenbong extending into New South Wales.

Killarney bordered on the northern boundaries of the Yetimarala. Originally part of Canning Downs, established by the Leslie brothers in 1840, the development of the town was largely based on primary production and forestry.

The name of the district was chosen by the Hon. Peter Murray, who was visiting George Leslie at the Canning Downs pastoral station and commented that the scenery reminded him of Killarney in County Kerry, Ireland.

Killarney State School was established on 17 August 1874. However, it was not until 1 January 1876 that teacher Gwyther Hill was appointed and students enrolled.

The South Killarney town site was first surveyed in 1878, but the town already boasted several shops and services by this time.  Many early settlers to Queensland selected land in the Killarney area with the first of these arriving in 1863. During the 1880s Killarney was described as "one of the most flourishing towns in Southern Queensland".

The first Killarney Post Office opened on 1 July 1877 (a receiving office had been open from 1875). Killarney North Post Office opened on 26 June 1889 (replacing Killarney North Railway Station receiving office open from 1887) and was renamed North Killarney in 1897. In 1905 the Killarney office was renamed Killarney South, and the North Killarney office became the second Killarney office, due to the town having moved to near the railway station.

A branch railway was built from Warwick in 1885. The line closed in 1964.

Mountain View Provisional School opened circa 1886 and closed in 1892. In 1895, it reopened as Mountain View State School, finally closing on 4 July 1965. It was at 11 Mountain View Road, Killarney.

A Methodist church opened in 1902. In 1919, the church building was relocated to Brighton (near Sandgate).

Melrose State School opened on 1910 and closed on circa 1931.

Wynola State School was established in 1935 at River Bank  from the town of Killarney, following the discovery that several families in that district were illiterate. It is presumed the school was in the vicinity of the Wynola pastoral station to the north-east of the town on the Condamine River Road. The school building from the closed Melrose State School was relocated to establish the new school. The school was officially opened on 19 October 1935 by John Healy, the Member of the Queensland Legislative Assembly for Warwick. The school closed circa 1941.

The town was hit by a destructive tornado on Friday 22 November 1968, which destroyed many of the original buildings. The main street buildings that survived the storm: the Butter Factory, the Co-op Building, Mackenzie’s Emporium (now a St Vincent de Paul boutique), former Commercial Bank (opposite the Post Office), the Post Office and the Killarney Hotel, hint at the town's former glory.  The former National bank building did survive the storm but was relocated to a suburb of Brisbane in 1977. The old Bank Vault foundation stones remain on the vacant block in the buildings original location adjacent to the St Vincent de Paul boutique. November 2008 marks the 40th anniversary of this storm.

Economy
The local economy is underpinned by agriculture, abattoirs (which was closed in February 2011), transport and more recently tourism.

Water supply
Water to the town is supplied from a small weir on Spring Creek. In April 2007, the Courier Mail newspaper reported that the town might have to be evacuated due to water shortages caused by years of extreme drought. In January 2008 the Condamine River broke its banks after a week of steady rain and buildings in the main street were flooded. Since that time Killarney has returned to the verdant green hills that local long term residents find more familiar.

Education 
Killarney P-10 State School is a government primary and secondary (Prep-10) school for boys and girls at Acacia Street. In 2017, the school had an enrolment of 149 students with 15 teachers (14 full-time equivalent) and 14 non-teaching staff (11 full-time equivalent). It includes a special education program.

There is no secondary school in Killarney offering Years 11 and 12; the nearest secondary school offering Years 11 and 12 schooling is in Warwick.

Amenities
The Killarney Co-operative is Killarney's main street under one roof.  Partially operating in the original Milward's General Store, originally established in 1913 as the Killarney Dairy Company, the Co-operative was formed in 1922 and remains community owned.  In 2008, the "Co-op" was a department store boasting in-store banking, gifts, shoes, electrical, hardware, garden, agricultural supplies, supermarket, delicatessen and coffee shop.

Several key buildings remain in Willow St. The Killarney Post Office was built in 1905.  The CWA building, formerly the School of Arts, was built in 1888 on stilts over Gravel Creek and is testament to how crowded the main street had become at the town's height.  The Killarney Hotel is located in Willow St and is the third hotel to sit on this site.

Killarney has many active community and sporting groups including the Killarney Area Promotion Association and the Killarney Cutters Rugby League club.

The Killarney Recreation Club has been a recent addition to the townscape on the southern side of town, built with funds raised by the local community.  Two sandstone horseheads at the entrance to the Polocrosse Fields and the "God of Sport Statue" in front of the Club were created by locally based sculptor Paul Stumkat.

The Southern Downs Regional Council operates a mobile library service which visits Canning Park on the corner of Willow and Oleander Streets.

The Killarney branch of the Queensland Country Women's Association meets at 12 Willow Street.

Attractions

The five waterfalls surrounding Killarney make this area a popular scenic destination, the Teviot Falls, Queen Mary Falls, Dagg's Falls, Browns Falls and Upper Brown's Falls. During wet weather there are two additional falls, Black Fella Falls and Jack Brunton's Falls, which can be seen tumbling down the cliffs surrounding Killarney at the bottom of the Cambanoora Gorge.

The annual agricultural show, rodeos, various horse-related events and the annual Border Ranges Trail Ride are major events that attract substantial numbers of visitors to the town.

Climate
Killarney has a cool subtropical climate, like most of inland south-east Queensland. Winters can be cold and frosty, while summers are warm but rarely hot.

Notable people
 Jackie Howe, champion shearer, born in Killarney
 Otto Madsen, politician

References

External links

 
 Town map of Killarney, 1976

Towns in the Darling Downs
1878 establishments in Australia
Southern Downs Region
Populated places established in 1878
Localities in Queensland